Midway is an unincorporated community near the Pikes Peak Cog Railway in El Paso County, Colorado.

References

Unincorporated communities in El Paso County, Colorado
Unincorporated communities in Colorado